Zdenĕk Sláma (born 28 December 1982), is a Czech futsal player who plays for Balticflora Teplice and the Czech Republic national futsal team.

References

External links
UEFA profile

1982 births
Living people
Czech men's futsal players